Watch What Happens may refer to:

 "Watch What Happens", the English-language version of the song "Recit de Cassard" by Michel Legrand from the 1964 film The Umbrellas of Cherbourg
 Watch What Happens, a 1967 jazz album by Harold Vick
 Watch What Happens!, a 1968 jazz album by Steve Kuhn
 Watch What Happens, a 1968 album by Chris Montez
 Watch What Happens, a 1978 jazz album by The L.A. Four
 The Jazz Album: Watch What Happens, a 2006 album by Thomas Quasthoff
 Watch What Happens Live with Andy Cohen, an American talk show